Chattaroy may refer to:

Chattaroy, Washington
Chattaroy, West Virginia